Loxophlebia picta is a moth of the subfamily Arctiinae. It was described by Francis Walker in 1854. It is found in the Amazon region, with some more recent observations in Peru and Colombia.

References

 

Loxophlebia
Moths described in 1854